Stadionul Emilian Pavel is a multi-purpose stadium in Ghiroda, Romania. It is currently used mostly for football matches and is the home ground of CSC Ghiroda. The stadium holds 2,000 people (200 on seats) and in 2017 was renovated and upgraded, now having a new pitch and a floodlight system.

References

Football venues in Romania
Buildings and structures in Timiș County